Clifford Linedecker is an American investigative journalist and author of true crime books.

Biography

Linedecker was born in Plymouth, Indiana and graduated from Plymouth High School in 1950.  He wrote for the high school paper.  He joined the Navy in 1952, and found himself stationed on a small island where some officers decided to address a problem with low morale by assigning Linedecker and four other men to start a newspaper.

Linedecker met and married Yang Soon (Junko) Ri in 1957, while stationed in Yokohama, Japan.

He and his wife retired to Lantana, Florida.

Career

Linedecker's first job was as a reporter for the LaPorte Herald-Argus in La Porte, Indiana.  He later worked for many years as an editor at the National Examiner.  He worked for a series of newspapers, including the Terre Haute Tribune, The Times in Hammond, the Fort Wayne News-Sentinel, the Times-Union in Rochester, N.Y., and The Philadelphia Inquirer.

Linedecker's first published book was Psychic Spy, one of three books he wrote before taking up true crime writing. the three included the bestseller, My Live with Elvis, co-authored with Elvis Presley's former secretary.

His first true crime book was The Man Who Killed Boys, an account of serial killer John Wayne Gacy, was published in 1980.

Books

True Crime Books
The Man Who Killed Boys. 1980.
Night Stalker. 1991.
Smooth Operator: The True Story of Seductive Serial Killer Glen Rogers. New York: St. Martin's Paperbacks. 1997.
Babyface Killers: Horrifying True Stories of America's Youngest Murderers. 1999.

Other books
My Life with Elvis, co-authored with Becky Yancey.

References

American non-fiction crime writers
National Enquirer people